Demagogus larvatus is a species of beetle in the family Cerambycidae, and the only species in the genus Demagogus. It was described by Thomson in 1868, and is found in Kenya and Ethiopia.

References

Sternotomini
Beetles described in 1868